Frederick Robert Vere Douglas-Hamilton (1843–1917) was an engineer of Scottish ancestry. He was descended from James Hamilton, 4th Duke of Hamilton.

Biography
He was born in London on 7 December 1843, the eldest son of diplomat Frederic Douglas-Hamilton and Marina (born Norton). 
He grew up in London and Madeira, and studied mathematics and civil engineering in Karlsruhe. He later worked as a railway engineer on the construction of the Schwarzwaldbahn. In 1873 he married Josefine Baumann, the daughter of an innkeeper in Hornberg. From 1910 until his death he lived in Bad Cannstatt.

Ancestry
 James Hamilton, 4th Duke of Hamilton, 1658–1712
 Lord Anne Hamilton, 1709–1748
 Charles Powell Hamilton, 1747–1825
 Augustus Barrington Price Anne Powell Hamilton, 1781–1849 
 Frederic Douglas-Hamilton, 1815–1887 
 Frederick Robert Vere Douglas-Hamilton

Death
He died at Bad Cannstatt in 1917 and is buried in the Uff-Kirchhof cemetery.

References

Frederick
Scottish engineers
1843 births
1917 deaths